Da-bin is a Korean unisex given name.  Its meaning differs based on the hanja used to write each syllable of the name. There are seven hanja with the reading "da" and 25 hanja with the reading "bin" on the South Korean government's official list of hanja which may be used in given names.

People with this name include:
Kim Da-bin (born 1989), South Korean male football player
Kim Da-bin (tennis) (born 1997), South Korean female tennis player
Dabin (music producer), a Canadian male music producer
Lee Da-bin (born 1996), South Korean female taekwondo practitioner
Yeonwoo (born Lee Da-bin, 1996) South Korean actress, former member of Momoland
Jeong Da-bin (1980–2007), South Korean actress
Jung Da-bin (actress, born 2000), South Korean actress
Choi Da-bin (born 2000), South Korean female figure skater
DPR Live (born Hong Da-bin, 1993), South Korean male rapper and singer

See also
List of Korean given names
Dabin (disambiguation)

References

Korean unisex given names